Kristina Kliukevičiūtė (born July 10, 1975 in Kaunas) is a Lithuanian rhythmic gymnast.

Kliukevičiūtė competed for Lithuania in the rhythmic gymnastics individual all-around competition at the 1996 Summer Olympics in Atlanta. There she was 37th in the qualification round and did not advance to the semifinal.

References

External links 
 
 

1975 births
Living people
Lithuanian rhythmic gymnasts
Gymnasts at the 1996 Summer Olympics
Olympic gymnasts of Lithuania
Sportspeople from Kaunas